Mariusz Podkościelny (born April 29, 1968) is a former freestyle swimmer from Poland, who, twice competed at the Summer Olympics: in 1988 and 1992. Since 2003, he was a swimming coach for the University of Miami.  He is currently the head coach for the swim team and teaching history at Pine Crest School in Fort Lauderdale, Florida.

1988 Olympics 
Mariusz finished 5th in both the 400m and 1500m freestyle. In the preliminary round for the 400m, he set the Olympic Record, which he held for about 10 hours.

Personal life 
Mariusz married Dagmara, also Polish, and had a daughter named Julia.

References

External links
 
 
 Sports Swimming World Magazine Article

1968 births
Living people
Swimming coaches
Miami Hurricanes swimming coaches
Olympic swimmers of Poland
Oregon State University faculty
Swimmers at the 1988 Summer Olympics
Swimmers at the 1992 Summer Olympics
Polish male freestyle swimmers
Arizona Wildcats men's swimmers
Sportspeople from Gdańsk
European Aquatics Championships medalists in swimming